The flag of North Central Province, was adopted for the North Central Province of Sri Lanka in 1987.

Symbolism
The flag is similar to that of the national flag, with the yellow border, the two vertical green and orange stripes and the four Bo leaves in the corner of the maroon box. The centre however depicts ancient ruins from the North Central Province such as a statue of Parakramabahu I of Sri Lanka and an Ancient Sri Lankan stupa.

See also
 Flag of Sri Lanka
 List of Sri Lankan flags

References

External links
 North Central Provincial Council
 Flagspot
 Sri Lanka.Asia

North Central Province
North Central Province
North Central Province, Sri Lanka
North Central Province